Henry Harland (March 1, 1861 – December 20, 1905) was an American novelist and editor.

Biography
Harland was born in Norwich, Connecticut, in 1861, the son of Fourierist Thomas Harland, who had been a one-time roommate of editor and author Edmund Clarence Stedman. He was raised in New York and, after the Civil War, the Harlands lived in a German Jewish section of the city.

Harland attended the City College of New York and briefly Harvard Divinity School. In May 1884, he married Aline Herminie Merriam, who shared his artistic interests. His literary career falls into two distinct sections. During the first of these, writing under the pseudonym Sidney Luska, he produced a series of highly sensational novels, written with little regard to literary quality. His novels written under this persona in the 1880s became the first popularly-read books to feature the American Jewish experience, which Harland both celebrated and criticized. Harland's depictions were met with wide criticism from the Jewish community. One review in the Philadelphia-based Jewish Exponent said one of his books was "grossly inartistic" and expressed "condescension" and "vulgar assumption towards Jews". Kaufmann Kohler in The Menorah complained that, in Harland's novels "the Jews, as a class, lack refinement".

But in 1889 Harland moved to London and fell under the influence of the Aesthetic movement. He began writing under his own name and, in 1894, became the founding editor of The Yellow Book. The short story collections of this new period, A Latin Quarter Courtship (1889), Mademoiselle Miss (1893), Grey Roses (1895), and Comedies and Errors (1898), were praised by critics but had little general popularity. He finally achieved a wide readership with The Cardinal's Snuff-box (1900), which was followed by The Lady Paramount (1901) and My Friend Prospero (1903). Hamlin Garland met him around this time and noted that he had affected a fake English accent. Garland recalled, "his 'extraoinary' English accent was comical. He spoke quite like the caricatured Englishman of our comedy stage. He is completely expatriated now and unpleasantly aggressive in his defense of England and English ways."

Harland's last novel, The Royal End (1909), was incomplete when he died. His wife finished it according to his notes. He died in 1905 at Sanremo, Italy, after a prolonged period of tuberculosis.

After his death, Henry James wrote positively about both Harland and The Yellow Book, though he had previously disparaged both.

Works 
 As It Was Written: A Jewish Musician's Story (1885)
 Mrs Peixada (1886)
 My Uncle Florimond (1888)
 Grandison Mather (1889)
 Mademoiselle Miss, and Other Stories (1889)
 Two Women or One? From the Mss. of Dr. Leonard Benary (1890)
 The Yellow Book, An Illustrated Quarterly. Vol. 1, April 1894 
 The Yellow Book, An Illustrated Quarterly, Vol. 2, July 1894 
 Grey Roses (1895)
 The Yoke Of The Thorah (1896)
 Comedies and Errors (1898)
 The Cardinal's Snuff-Box (1900)
 The Lady Paramount (1902)
 My Friend Prospero (1903)
 The Royal End: A Romance (1909)

References

 The Oxford Companion to American Literature. 6th Edition. Edited by James D. Hart, revised by Phillip W. Leininger. New York & Oxford: Oxford University Press, 1996. p. 271. .
 
 Foote, Stephanie.  "Ethnic Plotting: Henry Harland and the Jewish Writer." American Literature.  March 2003 (75:1): 119–140.

External links

 
 
 
"The Story of America’s Non-Jewish, First ‘Jewish Novelist’" by Harold Brackman, The Algemeiner, May 5, 2021
Article from March 1895 edition of The Bookman (New York) on Henry Harland and The Yellow Book

1861 births
1905 deaths
19th-century American novelists
20th-century American novelists
American magazine editors
American male novelists
Converts to Roman Catholicism
Writers from Brooklyn
19th-century American male writers
20th-century American male writers
Novelists from New York (state)
20th-century American non-fiction writers
American male non-fiction writers